Tyler Perry's Madea's Tough Love is a 2015 American live action-animated comedy film directed by Frank Marino, written by Matt Fleckenstein and Benjamin Gluck produced by Tyler Perry, Matt Moore, and Ozzie Areu, and starring the voices of Perry, Cassi Davis, Rolonda Watts, Avery Kidd Waddell, Philip Anthony-Rodriguez, Georg Stanford Brown, Kevin Michael Richardson, Mari Williams, Indigo, Caitlyn Taylor Love, Maya Kay, Kate Higgins, and Bootsy Collins. The film tells the story of Madea being sentenced to community service at a youth center as she comes across a devious plot to destroy it. It was released on January 20, 2015. While the film is mainly animated and serves as Tyler Perry Studios' first live action-animated film, the beginning and ending scenes however are live-action like the other Madea films.

Plot
In the live-action real world, Madea (Tyler Perry) is watching television while eating her breakfast. After wishing she could discipline the kids in the animated show she is watching, she is transported into the cartoon.

In the animated world, Madea chases a group of rude and unruly skateboarders, a chase that the police soon join. Madea elicits an apology from the skateboarders, but is subsequently arrested by Officer Frank (Philip Anthony-Rodriguez), Officer Fred (Avery Kidd Waddell), and their fellow police officers for excessive damage to public property, two bench warrants, 25 unpaid parking tickets, and an unpaid speeding ticket.

At the courthouse with her nephew Brian Simmons (Tyler Perry) defending her, Madea is placed under house arrest by Judge Michaels (Kevin Michael Richardson) much to the annoyance of her brother Joe (Tyler Perry) and sentenced to community service guiding the young souls at the Moms Mabley Youth Center where a special monitor is placed on her to make sure she does her job as Officers Fred and Frank are assigned to keep an eye on Madea.

With Joe and Aunt Bam (Cassi Davis) present, Madea attends the youth center's gym class and is horrified at the kids’ raucous behavior. Madea locks the children in a cage, but the children protest, claiming they have to practice to win a local sporting event and its cash prize. The police are alerted to Madea's actions and Officers Frank and Fred return her home.

That evening, Madea returns to the youth center to find her purse. She encounters two of the children, Netta (Mari Williams) and Dang Dang (Indigo), who are also looking for the purse. After learning the children are homeless, Madea takes them home with her. Madea makes the children breakfast in the morning, but after learning Madea is planning to call social services Netta and Dang Dang leave.

Madea finds Netta and Dang Dang playing basketball with the other children at Moms Mabley Youth Center in Freedom Park. However, the center is condemned by Betsy Holiday (Rolonda Watts), a mayoral candidate for Atlanta. Holiday details her plans to construct new buildings and make the city's neighborhoods safe for children. However, Madea distrusts Holiday's intentions. Madea takes the children to Chastain Park, which has since been repurposed into a shopping mall, and explains this is what Holiday intends to do with their youth center. Madea breaks into Holiday's headquarters and confronts her. Madea learns Holiday also has a team entering the sporting event, the "Chastain Park Players".

Madea rallies the children together. They ultimately defeat the Chastain Park Players in the sporting event and win the $25,000 prize, which they will use to save the youth center. Madea and the children celebrate, but Holiday steals the check and speeds away, with Madea and the police able to catch her.

The youth center is saved and Madea, Joe, and Aunt Bam are watching a friendly basketball game while Betsy Holiday is seen doing community service. She implies that she is happier now that she is not running for mayor or working for bosses anymore, but Madea teases her by throwing chips on the floor.

Back in the live-action real world, Madea wakes up back at her kitchen table eating breakfast, wondering if the whole thing was a dream.

Cast
 Tyler Perry as
 Madea Simmons, a tough old lady.
 Joe Simmons, the brother of Madea.
 Brian Simmons, a lawyer who is the nephew of Madea and the son of Joe.
 Cassi Davis as Aunt Bam, the cousin of Madea.
 Rolonda Watts as Betsy Holiday, a mayoral candidate that wants to level Freedom Park.
 Avery Waddell|Avery Kidd Waddell as Officer Fred, a police officer assigned to oversee Madea's community service.
 Philip Anthony-Rodriguez as Officer Frank, a police officer assigned to oversee Madea's community service.
 Georg Stanford Brown as Mystery Man
 Kevin Michael Richardson as Judge Michaels, a judge that sentences Madea to community service at the Moms Mabley Youth Center.
 Mari Williams as Netta 
 Indigo as Dang Dang
 Caitlyn Taylor Love as Wheels and Chris 
 Maya Kay as Lacy
 Kate Higgins as Yoshi
 Bootsy Collins as Homeless Man 
 Dan Gordon as Police Officer #1
 Jess Harnell as Campaign Manager and Announcer
 Mela Lee as Old Lady
 Nic Robuck as Police Officer #2
 Keith Silverstein as Helicopter Cop
 Cree Summer as Woman in Crowd (credited) and Female Police Officer (uncredited)

Crew
 Charlie Adler - Voice Director
 Craig Hartlin - Voice Director

Reception
Brian Orndorf of Blu-ray.com gave the film a five out of ten, saying "Tough Love plays to the Perry fanbase, featuring cameos by Madea’s brother Joe and Aunt Bam (Cassi Davis), and keeps its street cred with a finale that includes a chase between two cars fitted with hydraulics. It’s also blessedly short (64 minutes), which is exactly the type of brevity this character needs to succeed. Madea’s Tough Love isn’t funny, not even amusing, but it’s palatable, which is a rare reaction to a Perry project. The ending promises a sequel, which isn’t necessary, but if Madea must return to action, I’d rather watch her as an animated character than endure Perry in drag once again."

References

External links
 
 

2015 direct-to-video films
2015 animated films
2015 films
2015 comedy films
American films with live action and animation
Lionsgate films
Rough Draft Studios films
2010s American animated films
Works by Tyler Perry
2010s English-language films
American children's animated comedy films